Jim Goodman is a former American football coach, scout, and executive.  He was served the first head football coach at Valdosta State University in Valdosta, Georgia, serving from 1982 to 1984, compiling a record of 15–16.  Goodman was the interim general manager of the Denver Broncos of the National Football League (NFL) in 2008.

References

Year of birth missing (living people)
Living people
Air Force Falcons football coaches
Arkansas Razorbacks football coaches
Denver Broncos executives
Denver Broncos scouts
National Football League general managers
North Alabama Lions football coaches
Rice Owls football coaches
Valdosta State Blazers football coaches
High school football coaches in Florida
Junior college football coaches in the United States
University of Florida alumni